Route 200, known locally as Saddle Road, traverses the width of the Island of Hawaii, from downtown Hilo to its junction with Hawaii Route 190 near Waimea. The road was once considered one of the most dangerous paved roads in the state, with many one-lane bridges and areas of marginally maintained pavement. Most of the road has now been repaved, and major parts have new re-alignments to modern standards. The highway is mostly one-lane in each direction, but there are two lanes on the uphill portions. Many rental car companies used to prohibit use of their cars on Saddle Road, but now allow use of the road. The highway experiences heavy use as it provides the shortest driving route from Hilo to Kailua-Kona and access to the slopes of Mauna Loa and the Mauna Kea Observatories.

Route description

Waiānuenue Avenue
The mile marker 0 is posted in Hilo on the traffic signal at the intersection of Waiānuenue Avenue, Kamehameha Avenue and Bayfront Highway at coordinates . The route continues mauka along Waiānuenue Avenue to a little over a half-mile past the mile 1 where it veers left onto Kaūmana Drive near Gilbert Carvalho Park. Further along Waiānuenue Avenue is Rainbow Falls Park (Wai means "water" (fresh) in the Hawaiian language; ānuenue means "rainbow". Thus "Rainbow Falls" is rendered as Waiānuenue).
Total miles = 1.7 (2.7 km)

Kaūmana Drive

Starting at the “Y” junction adjacent to Gilbert Carvalho Park, Highway 200 continues mauka (uphill) on Kaūmana Drive and provides access to neighborhoods overlooking Hilo. The road is quite narrow and windy with many blind corners, hidden driveways and open drainage ditches. Near mile 4 it passes Kaumana Cave, a lava tube. Just past mile 6 (coordinates ) is the junction with Pūainakō Street Extension, (Hawaii Route 2000), completed in September 2004 as a bypass of the above-mentioned windy sections. The intersection with Ua Nahele Street at mile 8 marks the mauka terminus of Kaūmana Drive.
Total miles =

Saddle Road
The official start of Saddle Road is at the “T” intersection of Ua Nahele Street at mile 8. This is the last neighborhood through which the route will pass. As it has from its beginning in Hilo, Route 200 continues to climb towards the Humuula Saddle between Mauna Kea and Mauna Loa. The rainforest of the Hilo Forest Reserve and Upper Waiākea Forest Reserve surround the roadway and begin to thin as the elevation increases. Quality of the asphalt surface is quite good on this side of the crest but there are many curves and rises with limited visual distances. There are no tourist services or other infrastructure on the Saddle Road.

Reconstruction of the sections from mileposts 11 to 19 and 19 to 28 was finished in November 2011 and October 2008, respectively.

The terrain becomes the high lava desert of the Humuula Saddle.

It was connected in 1963 to the old Tom Vance road from 1950.

Mauna Kea Observatory on the summit, an ideal location for astronomical seeing, is under the jurisdiction of the University of Hawaii Institute for Astronomy.

West and northwest of these turnoffs, the  segment of Route 200 from milepost 28 to 35 was dedicated and opened to traffic on May 29, 2007, with Senator Daniel K. Inouye as the keynote speaker and other local dignitaries. The new segment is quite a contrast to the roadway near the Pōhakuloa Training Area. The old section of roadway included some of the more dangerous features of the old Saddle Road: a sharp curve, blind corner and one way bridge near the entrance to Mauna Kea State Recreation Area that was one of the worst on the roadway. In contrast, the new section was constructed to full federal highway standards, with wide shoulders, rumble strips, good signage and emergency phones at regular intervals.

From milepost 35 to 44 the road passes the main gates of Pōhakuloa Training Area and Bradshaw Army Airfield before continuing across the military reservation. Military vehicles – including armored personnel carriers – occasionally cross or occupy the roadway.  Artillery exercises, including live fire, are not uncommon. with batteries set up along the roadway firing towards Mauna Loa. This section of the road was repaved in the summer of 2008, greatly improving the conditions.

On August 18, 2009, the completely rebuilt section, from milepost 35 to 42, opened to public travel. The realignment relocated the highway north to the Mauna Kea side of the Army base and Bradshaw Army Airfield.

A new section starting near mile marker 42 that bypasses Waikii and connects to Māmalahoa Highway near mile marker 14,  opened September 7, 2013. At this time, the highway was officially renamed the Daniel K. Inouye Highway in honor of the late senator from Hawaii.

This new section avoids the old route, where from milepost 44, near Kilohana, to the Māmalahoa Highway the road retained its original character, a narrow ribbon of poorly maintained pavement with crumbling edges. On the old section, there are several one-lane bridges, blind curves and hills. It is common for drivers to negotiate the center of the road to avoid the rough shoulders, moving back into the lane only when necessary to pass traffic proceeding in the opposite direction. The route is quite scenic with views of the coastline, the Hualālai and Kohala volcanoes, winding its way across Parker Ranch and through the development of Waikii.

The original western terminus of Route 200 comes at its junction with Māmalahoa Highway (state route 190)  toward Kona of Waimea (coordinates ).
Total miles =

History
In May 1849, Minister of Finance Gerrit P. Judd proposed building a road directly between the two population centers of the Island of Hawaii.
Although destroyed at lower elevations due to residential development, it can still be seen on maps as the "Judd Trail".

Since it was not intended as a civilian road, the simple gravel path was built by the Civilian Conservation Corps and the US Army Corps of Engineers in case of an invasion. Military vehicles of all types and treads traversed the Island for the next three years.

Following the end of World War II in 1945, the Army turned over jurisdiction of the road to the Territory of Hawaii and it was designated "State Route 20". However, the territorial government had few funds to maintain the road, let alone upgrade it to civilian standards. Much of the paving dates from 1949.

About the same time, Tom Vance, who had earlier supervised building a highway up Mauna Loa named for Governor Ingram Stainback, secretly used his prison laborers to start a more direct Hilo-Kona road. He started at a camp  (still called "Vance" on USGS maps) which was exactly midway between Hilo and Kealakekua. The road extended in a straight line, heading for the pass between Hualālai and Mauna Loa.
In 1950, the camp caught fire after construction reached . The public refused to allocate more funding when they discovered about US$1 million had already been spent, so the project was also abandoned.

After islands became the State of Hawaii in 1959, Saddle Road was handed to the County of Hawaii and for many years only minimal maintenance was performed, leading to generally poor conditions and the source of the road's notorious reputation.

Since 1992, there has been increased attention on the road, with efforts to rebuild and renovate the highway into a practical cross-island route. This resulted in repaving some sections and complete rebuilding of others. The entire road is now well paved, and in the uphill sections there is a separate lane for trucks and slower cars.

Future
Eventual plans are to complete a section past Māmalahoa Highway down to the coast and intersecting the Queen Kaahumanu Highway (state route 19) to support cross-island commuting by tourists and resort employees. The route for the entirely new sections of the highway was changed after the 2006 expansion of the military exercise areas. Completion of these projects represent a major realignment of island traffic patterns and conversion of this notorious roadway into a modern state highway.

Major intersections

Related route

Hawaii Route 2000 is a  road on the island of Hawaii, in the state of Hawaii. The road's western terminus is at Hawaii Route 200 (known as the Saddle Road). The eastern terminus is at Hawaii Route 11 (known as the Hawaii Belt Road) in Hilo where the Prince Kūhiō Plaza shopping center is located. Route 2000 is called Pūāinakō Street Extension, East Pūāinakō Street, and West Pūāinakō Street. The project was planned since 1995.

See also

 List of state highways in Hawaii
 List of highways numbered 200

References

External links

 Official Hawaii Saddle Road Web site

 0200
Transportation in Hawaii County, Hawaii